The Norwegian Rugby Union is the governing body for rugby union in Norway. It was founded in 1982 and became affiliated to the International Rugby Board in 1993.

See also
Norway national rugby union team
Rugby union in Norway

External links
 Norges Rugbyforbund - Official Site

Rugby union in Norway
Rugby union governing bodies in Europe
Sports organizations established in 1982
1982 establishments in Norway